Hirnyk is an urban-type settlement in Rovenky Municipality in Rovenky Raion of Luhansk Oblast (region) in eastern Ukraine. Population: , .

Since early 2014, the settlement has been administered as a part of the de facto Luhansk People's Republic.

References

Urban-type settlements in Rovenky Raion
Populated places established in the Ukrainian Soviet Socialist Republic
Rovenky